Homoeosoma nebulella, the Eurasian sunflower moth, is a moth of the  family Pyralidae. It is found in Europe, Russia, Anatolia, the Middle East and West Africa. The wingspan is 20–27 mm.

The larvae feed on Asteraceae such as Cirsium vulgare, Senecio jacobaea, Tanacetum vulgare and Leucanthemum vulgare. They are a serious pest of the sunflower, Helianthus annuus, in eastern Europe and Ukraine and a potential sunflower pest in France. The caterpillar is grey with a yellow-brown head and three longitudinal stripes on the dorsal side.

References

External links
 UK Moths

Phycitini
Moths described in 1775
Moths of Africa
Moths of Europe
Moths of the Middle East
Moths of Asia